The 2018 LEN Men's Europa Cup is the inaugural tournament of the LEN Europa Cup.

Preliminary
February 15–18, 2018

Group A

Group B

Group C

Super Final
April 5–8, 2018

Qualified teams

Group A

Group B

7th place game

5th place game

3rd place game

Final

Final ranking

References

External links
2018 LEN Men's Europa Cup (official website)

LEN Europa Cup
2018 in water polo